Pokesdown railway station serves the Pokesdown, Boscombe and Southbourne areas of Bournemouth in Dorset, England.

The station is served by South Western Railway, who operate semi-fast services from London Waterloo to Weymouth and stopping services from London to Poole.

The station

The station was opened on 1 July 1886 by the London and South Western Railway. It was originally named  Boscombe, which was altered on 1 October 1891 to Pokesdown (Boscombe), since the station was closer to Pokesdown than Boscombe. On 1 May 1897, when Boscombe station was opened, the station was renamed again to just "Pokesdown".

In 1930, the station was again renamed, becoming Pokesdown for Eastern Bournemouth, although it reverted to Pokesdown under British Railways. In the 1930s the Southern Railway made the platform facilities considerably larger, allowing the station to accommodate longer trains. Although some facilities have since been removed, at the time they provided an asset for the non-stopping services because there were tracks to use as fast lines in the up and down direction.

During the 1970s two of the four tracks were removed, and the signal box was closed.

On 16 May 2009 the station signage was changed to Pokesdown for Boscombe with announcements at other stations and on trains changed later on but the station remains officially named Pokesdown. The station is a short bus journey or walk from Boscombe's main shopping area.

Some South Western Railway services operated by two four- or five-carriage electric multiple units coupled together cannot be accommodated fully by the platforms and only selected doors open on such trains.

Disabled access

Lifts are present at Pokesdown station but are now disused albeit with evidence of their former existence still in place. A campaign involving the local MP Tobias Ellwood which began calling for the restoration of lifts at the station appears to have been successful with the winning bidders for the South Western Franchise, South Western Railway, required to install new lifts by 31 December 2019.  However, this date has been pushed back to at least September 2020 because of difficulties accessing the disused lift shafts safely. Until lift access is restored, the only means of access to Pokesdown's platforms is via stairs from the bridge.

Services
All passenger trains serving this station are operated by South Western Railway.

As of February 2022, the following services call here in both directions:
 Monday - Friday
 1 train per hour on Weymouth - London Waterloo semi-fast service
 1 train per hour on Bournemouth - Winchester stopping service
 these services are join / split at Southampton Central from the fast Weymouth service giving 2 trains per hour for London in peak hours
 Saturday
 1 train per hour on Weymouth - London Waterloo semi-fast service
 1 train per hour on Poole - Winchester stopping service
 Sunday
 1 train per hour on Poole - London Waterloo stopping service

References

Railway stations in Great Britain opened in 1886
Former London and South Western Railway stations
Railway stations in Bournemouth
DfT Category E stations
Railway stations served by South Western Railway